Nikhil Kumaraswamy is an Indian actor and politician known for his work in Kannada films. He made his acting debut with the Kannada-Telugu bilingual film Jaguar (2016).

Personal life
Nikhil Kumarswamy is the son of former Karnataka Chief Minister H. D. Kumaraswamy and grandson of former India Prime Minister H. D. Deve Gowda.

On 10 February 2020 it became public that Nikhil got engaged to Revathi, the grand-niece of Congress leader and realtor M. Krishnappa at Taj West End Bangalore. The wedding took place on 17 April 2020 near Janapada Loka in Ramanagara. The couple has a son.

Political career

Nikhil ran in the 2019 Indian general election in Karnataka (Lok Sabha) from Mandya district as a Janata Dal (Secular) candidate. Mandya was considered a safe bastion for the Congress-JDS alliance as historically Indian National Congress was the most successful party, followed by Janata Dal (Secular) to contest in the district. He lost in the elections to Sumalatha wife of late Ambareesh by a margin of 128,876 votes.

Filmography

Awards

References

External links

 

1987 births
Living people
Male actors from Bangalore
Male actors in Kannada cinema
Indian male film actors
Kannada people
21st-century Indian male actors
Male actors in Telugu cinema
South Indian International Movie Awards winners
Janata Dal (Secular) politicians
People from Ramanagara
Politicians from Bangalore
People from Hassan
Indian actor-politicians